The International Association of Hebrew Free Loans (IAHFL) is an umbrella organization for Hebrew Free Loan societies, organizations that offer interest-free loans to Jews. There are members around the world, with most in North America. Each member organization has its own rules regarding such things as who may borrow, the maximum loan amount, and the repayment process. However, all offer loans without interest.

Hebrew Free Loan societies (such a society is also known as a Gemach) are based on the biblical injunction that Jews may not charge interest to other Jews in need, found in Exodus 22:25: "If you lend money to My people, to the poor among you, do not act towards them as a creditor; exact no interest from them." 

The IAHFL provides a forum for independent free loan societies to interact, share information, and helps establish new Hebrew Free Loans. There is an annual conference hosted by a member organization.

The IAHFL produces a newsletter several times a year.

Member organizations 

Members of the IAHFL include:

United States

 Akron, OH -- Free Loan Association (Akron, OH)
 Atlanta, GA -- Jewish Educational Loan Fund, Inc. (Atlanta)
 Atlanta, GA -- Jewish Interest Free Loan of Atlanta, Inc.
 Baltimore, MD -- Hebrew Free Loan Association of Baltimore
 Boca Raton, FL -- Ruth Rales Jewish Family Service (Boca Raton)
 Boston, MA -- Jewish Family & Children Service 
 Buffalo, NY -- Hebrew Benevolent Loan Association (Buffalo)
 Cincinnati, OH -- Jewish Federation of Cincinnati
 Cleveland, OH -- Hebrew Free Loan Association of Northeast Ohio
 Dallas, TX -- Dallas Hebrew Free Loan Association
 Denver, CO -- Jewish Interest Free Loan of Colorado
 Detroit, MI -- Hebrew Free Loan Detroit
 Fort Worth, TX -- Tarrant County Hebrew Free Loan Association
 Grand Rapids, MI -- Jewish Federation of Grand Rapids
 Houston, TX -- Hebrew Free Loan Association of Greater Houston
 Los Angeles, CA -- Jewish Free Loan Association (Los Angeles)
 Miami, FL -- Hebrew Free Loan Association of South Florida
 Minneapolis, MN -- Jewish Free Loan Program (Minneapolis)
 Milwaukee, WI -- Milwaukee Jewish Free Loan Association
 New Haven, CT -- Hebrew Burial & Free Loan Association of New Haven
 New Jersey (northern) -- Hebrew Free Loan of New Jersey
 New York, NY -- Hebrew Free Loan Society of New York
 New Orleans, LA -- Jewish Family Service (New Orleans)
 Paterson, NJ -- Paterson Hebrew Free Loan Association
 Philadelphia, PA -- Hebrew Free Loan Society of Greater Philadelphia 
 Phoenix, AZ -- Jewish Free Loan of Greater Phoenix
 Pittsburgh, PA -- Hebrew Free Loan Association of Pittsburgh
 Providence, RI -- Hebrew Free Loan Association of Providence
 Portland, OR -- Jewish Free Loan of Greater Portland
 Salt Lake City, UT -- Joseph & Evelyn Rosenblatt Free Loan Fund
 St. Louis, MO -- Jewish Loan Association (St. Louis)
 San Antonio, TX -- Hebrew Free Loan Association of San Antonio
 San Diego, CA -- Hebrew Free Loan of San Diego
 San Francisco, CA -- Hebrew Free Loan Association of San Francisco
 Sarasota, FL -- Sarasota-Manatee Jewish Federation
 Seattle, WA -- Hebrew Free Loan Association of Washington State
 Springfield, MA -- Hebrew Free Loan Assn. of Greater Springfield
 Tucson, AZ -- Hebrew Free Loan Association of Tucson
 Washington, DC -- Hebrew Free Loan Association of Greater Washington
 West Palm Beach, FL -- HFL of Palm Beach County

Canada

 Calgary, AB -- The Calgary Jewish Family Loan Association
 Hamilton, ON -- Hebrew Free Loan Association of Hamilton
 Montreal, PQ -- Hebrew Free Loan Association of Montreal
 Toronto, ON -- Toronto Jewish Free Loan Cassa
 Vancouver, BC -- Hebrew Free Loan Association of Vancouver
 Winnipeg, MB -- The Asper Helping Hand Initiative

Outside North America

 Buenos Aires, Argentina -- ACCEDER Hebrew Free Loan
 Jerusalem, Israel -- Israel Free Loan Association
 Jerusalem, Israel -- International Free Loan Association for Ukraine Loan Fund
 Melbourne, Australia -- Jewish Mutual Loan Company PTY, Ltd.

Annual conference 

The IAHFL holds a conference each year (normally in the fall) to provide an opportunity for networking and education. The conference is always hosted by a local Hebrew Free Loan, though the program is generally planned by the International.

Past conferences 

October, 2009 Hebrew Free Loan Detroit
October, 2008 Hebrew Free Loan Association of Cleveland
October, 2007 Hebrew Free Loan Association of Vancouver
September, 2006 Hebrew Free Loan Association of South Florida
2005 Hebrew Free Loan Association of San Francisco
October, 2004 Hebrew Free Loan Society of Greater Philadelphia

Future conferences 

2010 Dallas Hebrew Free Loan Association

References  
 A Credit to Their Community: Jewish Loan Societies in the United States 1880-1945, by Shelly Tanenbaum, Wayne State University Press, 1993. 
 Micro-Lending: A  Nonprofit Response to  Economic Crisis, by Eliezer David Jaffe

External links 
 
 Coverage of 2008 conference
Jewish charities
Microfinance organizations